Guanshan Village, also called by the locals as Alikuan (Taiwanese Romanization: Ah-lí-kuan) or Aliguan, is an indigenous Taivoan community located in Jiaxian District in Kaohsiung City, Taiwan. As driven by Chinese immigrants and Siraya, Taivoan people started to emigrate from Tainan to Kaohsiung in the early 18th century, and eventually founded the community in 1744. Alikuan was also an important battle field in Tapani incident in 1915.

Taivoan people in Alikuan were forced to migrate in group to nowadays Siaolin by the Japanese government during the Japanese occupation of Taiwan, eventually founding Siaolin Village in 1905.

See also 
 Taivoan

References 

Villages in Taiwan
Taivoan people
Geography of Kaohsiung